Vyacheslav Anatolievich Shalevich (27 May 1934 – 21 December 2016) was a Soviet-Russian film, theatre actor and a People's Artist of the RSFSR.

Biography
Vyacheslav Anatolievich Shalevich was born in Moscow in 1934. His father, Anatoly Shalevich, defected to the Red Army and rose to the rank of General of the NKVD. Vyacheslav believed his father had died in the Finnish war. Vyacheslav Anatolievich Shalevich spent his childhood with his mother, Elena.

In 1958 he graduated from the Boris Shchukin Theatre Institute. After graduation he was accepted into the troupe of the State Academic Theatre named after Vakhtangov. Vyacheslav Shalevich was one of the few actors who played in two films with the same name, but are not remakes, Red Square.

Selected filmography
 1958: The Captain's Daughter (Капитанская дочка) as Shvabrin
 1961: Barrier of the Unknown (Барьер неизвестности) as Baykalov
 1963: Now Let Him Go (Теперь пусть уходит) as Stan Beeston
 1967: Three Poplars in Plyushcikha (Три тополя на Плющихе) as Grisha
 1968: Virineya (Виринея) as Ivan Pavlovich
 1968: The Picture of Dorian Gray (Портрет Дориана Грея) as Alan
 1968: The Sixth of July (Шестое июля) as Yakov Blumkin
 1970: Red Square (Красная площадь) as Kutasov
 1970: My Street (Моя улица) as Semyon Semyonovich
 1971: The City Under Lindens (Город под липами) as Boris Popov
 1973: Seventeen Moments of Spring (Семнадцать мгновений весны) as Allen Dulles
 1976: Carlos Espinola Diary (Дневник Карлоса Эспинолы) as school principal
 1978: The Cure Against Fear (Лекарство против страха) as Panafidin
 1980: Code Name Is 'South Thunder' (Кодовое название «Южный гром») as General Beryozov
 1994: The Master and Margarita (Мастер и Маргарита) as Caiaphas
 1999: It's Not recommended To Offending Women (Женщин обижать не рекомендуется) as Admiral
 2004: Red Square (Красная площадь) as Aleksandr Rekunkov (Soviet Union Attorney General in 1981-1988)
 2004: Moscow Saga (Московская сага) as General

Honors
Honored Artist of the RSFSR (1971)
 People's Artist of the RSFSR (1979)
State Prize of the Russian Federation in the field of literature and art in 1994 (29 May 1995)  
 Order of Friendship of Peoples (6 May 1994) - for his great contribution in the field of theatrical art 
 Winner of the Government of Moscow (1996)
 Order of Honour(1 November 2001) - for many years of fruitful activity in the field of culture and art, a great contribution to strengthening friendship and cooperation between the nations 
 Order "For Merit to the Fatherland", 4th class (27 May 2004) - for his great contribution in the development of theatrical art '.

References

External links

 Вячеслав Шалевич
  Корифеи Вахтангова

1934 births
2016 deaths
Burials at Vagankovo Cemetery
Soviet male film actors
Soviet male stage actors
Soviet male television actors
Russian male film actors
Russian male stage actors
Russian male television actors
20th-century Russian male actors
21st-century Russian male actors
Recipients of the Order of Friendship of Peoples
People's Artists of the RSFSR
Honored Artists of the RSFSR
People's Artists of Russia
Recipients of the Order of Honour (Russia)
State Prize of the Russian Federation laureates